Zhang Enhe (1939- 13 November 2016) was a Chinese scientist who engaged himself in the course of Chinese aero engine development for more than 40 years.

Biography
Zhang was born in 1939, during the Second Sino-Japanese War. After graduating from Harbin Institute of Technology in 1965, he was assigned to Shenyang Engine Design Institute. In 1981, after the Cultural Revolution, Zhang was sent abroad to study at the New York Institute of Technology on government scholarships. Zhang returned to China in November 1983 and that year became team leader of Engine Room of the Shenyang Engine Design Institute. In 1985 he was promoted to deputy director. He served as chief engine engineer of the Xian Y-7, he led the team to achieve the goal of reducing oil by 9.4% of the engine, for which he won a gold medal conferred by the Chinese government. In 1987 Zhang was appointed deputy commander of the Taihang Engine, and four years later became its chief designer. In October 2007 he was awarded the Science and Technology Award of the Ho Leung Ho Lee Foundation. Zhang died of illness on November 13, 2016.

Awards
 Title of "Shenyang Model Worker"
 Liaoning Provincial May First Labour Medal
 National May First Labour Medal
 Special Award of the National Defense Science and Technology Progress Award
 Science and Technology Award of the Ho Leung Ho Lee Foundation

References

1939 births
2016 deaths
Harbin Institute of Technology alumni
New York Institute of Technology alumni
Chinese engineers